William John Smith (born December 12, 1950) is a Canadian former professional ice hockey goaltender. He won four Stanley Cups with the New York Islanders and was the first goalie to be credited with a goal in the NHL. In 2017 Smith was named one of the 100 Greatest NHL Players in history.

Playing career

NHL beginnings
Smith was drafted by the Los Angeles Kings in the 5th round of the 1970 NHL Amateur Draft from the Cornwall Royals of the QMJHL. He played two seasons with the Kings' minor league affiliate, the American Hockey League's Springfield Kings, and spent a brief stint with the big-league Kings after winning a Calder Cup for Springfield in 1971.

He made his NHL debut with the Los Angeles Kings on February 12, 1972, at the Montreal Forum. L.A. lost the game 6-5. Smith faced 48 shots that afternoon, yielding the winning goal to Guy Lafleur with 22 seconds remaining in the game. He was drafted in the 1972 NHL Expansion Draft by the New York Islanders; he was the second player picked by the team.

After sharing goaltending duties with Gerry Desjardins for two years, he got the starting job all to himself in 1974–75 when Desjardins bolted to the World Hockey Association. That season, he led the Islanders to their first playoff appearance.

New York Islanders
Smith played in the 1978 All-Star Game, where he was named MVP. For the rest of the decade, he shared time in the Islanders net with Chico Resch, where they combined to form perhaps the top goaltending duo in the NHL at the time.  This changed in the 1980 playoffs, when the Isles rode Smith's goaltending to their first of four consecutive Stanley Cups, firmly establishing Smith as the team's starting goaltender.  Resch was dealt to the Colorado Rockies the following season.  Smith went on to become a First Team All-Star and Vezina Trophy winner in 1982. In 1983, he won the William M. Jennings Trophy for fewest goals allowed (shared with Roland Melanson).  He was chosen to play for Canada in the 1981 Canada Cup, but was unable to play due to an injury sustained in a pre-tournament game.

Smith's regular season success, however, was surpassed by his performances in the playoffs, as he helped the Islanders win four straight Stanley Cups (1980–83), reach the finals five straight times (1980–84), and win a record 19 consecutive playoff series from 1980–84.

Smith was the first goalie to win the Stanley Cup wearing the helmet-and-cage combination mask, rather than the fiberglass mask which had been the standard from 1959, when it was introduced by Jacques Plante, until the early 1980s. Smith wore a fiberglass mask early in his career, but switched to the helmet-and-cage in 1978.

His single most famous game may be his 2–0 victory in the first game of the 1983 Stanley Cup finals against the Edmonton Oilers, shutting out the likes of Mark Messier, Wayne Gretzky, Jari Kurri, and Paul Coffey. The Islanders went on to sweep the Oilers in 4 games, with Smith allowing the Oilers only 6 goals and winning the Conn Smythe Trophy as Most Valuable Player in the Playoffs. A year later, Smith broke the record for the most Playoff victories: he led all goaltenders in playoff victories in total and in every individual year between 1980 and 1984. Then in 1985, Smith led the Islanders to win 3 straight games after being down 0–2 to the Washington Capitals, the first time such a comeback occurred in the NHL. Smith's playoff success feeds into his reputation as the supreme "money" goalie (or "clutch" goaltender) of his era, the person you would want in net with the season on the line. Teammates and observers have said that Smith seemed able to sense when he needed to be perfect to win and when he could give up five goals and still come away with the victory.

First NHL goal credited to a goaltender
Smith was the first NHL goaltender to be credited with scoring a goal. On November 28, 1979, in a game between the Islanders and the Colorado Rockies, the Rockies' goaltender left the ice for an extra attacker after a delayed penalty call was called on the Islanders. The puck deflected off of Smith's chest protector into the corner. Rockies rookie Rob Ramage picked up the puck and accidentally made a blind pass from the corner boards in the opposing zone to the blue line. Nobody was there to receive the pass, and so the puck sailed all the way down the length of the ice and into the Rockies' net. As Smith had been the last Islanders player to touch the puck, he was credited with the goal.

Retirement
Smith retired in 1989; he was the last original Islander still on the team. After four years as the Islanders' goaltending coach, he followed longtime Islander general manager Bill Torrey to the expansion Florida Panthers in the same role, serving there until his retirement in 2000.  He had spent 30 years at ice level in the NHL, the last 28 of them alongside Torrey with the Islanders (1972-1992) and the Panthers (1992-2000).

The Islanders retired his #31 on February 20, 1993. Later that year, he was inducted into the Hockey Hall of Fame, the only goalie inducted in the Hall in the 1990s. In 1998, he was ranked number 80 on The Hockey News' list of the 100 Greatest Hockey Players.

Personality
He was nicknamed "Battlin' Billy" or "Hatchet Man" for his fiery temper and unabashed use of the stick or blocker on players crowding his crease; as such, forwards needed ankle guards to protect themselves.

Smith was also noted for his displays of feigned injuries that would often lead to penalties against opponents, for whom he carried an undisguised enmity. For instance, in Game Four of the 1983 Stanley Cup Finals, Smith's dive resulted in referee Andy Van Hellemond handing a five-minute penalty to Glenn Anderson of the Edmonton Oilers. Van Hellemond said that this was "making a bit of a fool of me", and when he officiated Game One of the 1984 Finals, a rematch of the Islanders and Oilers, he called no penalty when Smith and Anderson collided.

Smith refused to participate in the traditional handshakes between teams at the end of a playoff series.

A notable incident with Smith occurred in practice where then-teammate Mike Bossy fired a shot at Smith to which Smith objected. Smith charged after Bossy with his stick but was tackled by teammates before Smith took his frustrations out on Bossy. Bossy also noted that Smith never liked being talked to in the locker room, and keeping an intense focus before and after games and practices, but is much more laid-back off the ice.

Awards and achievements
 Calder Cup championship in 1971.
 Played in 1978 NHL All-Star Game.
 Selected to the NHL First All-Star Team in 1982.
 Vezina Trophy winner in 1982.
 Conn Smythe Trophy winner in 1983.
 William M. Jennings Trophy winner in 1983 (shared with Roland Melanson).
 Stanley Cup championships in 1980, 1981, 1982, 1983.
 First NHL goalie to be credited with a goal in 1979.
 Inducted into the Hockey Hall of Fame in 1993.
 His #31 jersey was retired by the New York Islanders on February 20, 1993.
 In 1998, he was ranked number 80 on ''The Hockey News''' list of the 100 Greatest Hockey Players.
 1978 NHL All-Star Game MVP.
 In 2016, he was inducted into his home town Perth and District Sports Hall of Fame.
In 2017, he was listed on NHL's 100 Greatest Hockey Players

Career statistics

Regular season and playoffs

See also
List of NHL goaltenders with 300 wins

References

External links
 
 One for the Ages: Billy Smith's Incredible 1981-82 Season

1950 births
Canadian ice hockey goaltenders
Conn Smythe Trophy winners
Cornwall Royals (QMJHL) players
Florida Panthers coaches
Hockey Hall of Fame inductees
Ice hockey people from Ontario
Living people
Los Angeles Kings draft picks
Los Angeles Kings players
National Hockey League goaltenders who have scored in a game
National Hockey League players with retired numbers
New York Islanders coaches
New York Islanders players
People from Perth, Ontario
Springfield Kings players
Stanley Cup champions
Vezina Trophy winners
William M. Jennings Trophy winners
Canadian ice hockey coaches